The twelfth season of Law & Order: Special Victims Unit premiered in the United States on NBC on September 22, 2010, and concluded on May 18, 2011. This was the first season that the show did not air alongside the original Law & Order. Episodes initially aired on Wednesdays between 9pm/8c and 10pm/9c Eastern except for the season premiere which aired from 9pm/8c to 11pm/10c. After the winter hiatus, SVU returned with another two-hour showing on January 5, 2011, before the broadcast time switched to the 10pm/9c time slot the following week.

At the end of the season, Neal Baer resigned his position as showrunner. After the season finale, Christopher Meloni, BD Wong, and Tamara Tunie left the principal cast.

Production
For the first eleven years of Law & Order: SVU, the set had been located in New Jersey, at NBC's Central Archives building in North Bergen. Faced with losing the state's 20 percent tax incentive, the show moved to New York City into the studio space at Chelsea Piers that was occupied by the original Law & Order series. After the fourth episode of the season, the original New Jersey set was no longer used. Outdoor filming was halted on January 26, 2011, due to a blizzard.  Production resumed in the Chelsea Piers studio.

This season's third episode focused on an investigation involving a rape kit, which took Detective Olivia Benson (Hargitay) from New York City to Los Angeles to meet Los Angeles Police Department (LAPD) Detective Rex Winters (Skeet Ulrich). The episode was shot while Hargitay was in Los Angeles for the Primetime Emmy Awards in August 2010, and aired September 29, before the Law & Order: LA premiere on NBC.

Neal Baer left Law & Order: SVU at the end of the season, after serving eleven years (seasons 2–12) as showrunner. He chose not to renew his NBC contract, instead signing a three–year deal with CBS Studios.

Cast changes and returning characters
Australian newspaper Courier-Mail reported in February 2010 that season twelve would be Christopher Meloni's last, after his comment to the reporter that  "I think 12 years is enough, a good number" was misunderstood. Meloni later clarified that, at the time, he had one year left on his contract and the show had not been picked up. He also said "[i]t wasn't [the reporter's] fault", and that he would continue on the show as long as it is picked up. When asked in an interview if Mariska Hargitay could envision doing the show without him, she said, "Oh man, it breaks my heart to even think about it. I just love that man and I love acting with him, and I think it's our chemistry that makes the show what it is. So I don't even want to think about it".

  
On April 12, 2010, NBC officially picked up SVU for a twelfth season with Meloni and Hargitay returning as part of the one-year deal they struck with NBC before production began on season 11, which included an option for a second year. The two started shooting new episodes in June and July 2010. Hargitay expressed interest in her character having a baby this season, saying, "A boyfriend! A baby! I don't even have to get married. I just want a baby! Give me a baby!".

On June 23, 2010, Michael Ausiello reported that Paula Patton was in "advanced talks" to join the show, as a permanent ADA. TV Guide later confirmed that Patton would play Assistant District Attorney Mikka Von in multiple episodes, beginning with the fifth episode. She was set to fill the ADA slot left vacant by both Stephanie March (Alexandra Cabot) and guest star Sharon Stone (Jo Marlowe). Patton appeared in a single episode, dropping out to film Mission: Impossible – Ghost Protocol.  Her role was replaced by Melissa Sagemiller as ADA Gillian Hardwicke.  Sagemiller and Mariska Hargitay previously worked together on the SVU season one episode "Russian Love Poem", in which Sagemiller played a victim. "There's something in my past, a personal connection that we have, something that she did for me and a family member who she helped out ... She's not aware of it yet [but] it becomes revealed in the next several episodes", Sagemiller said. ADA Hardwicke's background was never revealed. Her personality, Sagemiller says, is front and center. "She's tough ... she has a heart, she just gets what she wants." Sagemiller also added, "She sticks to the letter of the law, sometimes to a fault, but in the end I think she always does the right thing".

Christine Lahti returned as EADA Sonya Paxton in the ninth episode "Gray". Paxton, previously exposed as an alcoholic in season 11, had apparently conquered her drinking problem. Baer told TVGuide.com, "She has a huge scene where she faces off with Stabler". Her character was later killed in the seventeenth episode.
Diane Neal returned as ADA Casey Novak for the episode "Reparations". Neal had previously made her last appearance in the ninth-season finale, in which her character was censured for violating due process in a rape case.

Cast

Main cast
 Christopher Meloni as Senior Detective Elliot Stabler
 Mariska Hargitay as Junior Detective Olivia Benson
 Richard Belzer as Senior Detective Sergeant John Munch
 Ice-T as Junior Detective Fin Tutuola
 BD Wong as FBI Special Agent Dr. George Huang
 Tamara Tunie as Medical Examiner Dr. Melinda Warner
 Dann Florek as Captain Donald "Don" Cragen

Crossover stars
 Skeet Ulrich as Los Angeles Police Department Senior Robbery-Homicide Division Detective Rex Winters (crossing over with Law & Order: Los Angeles)
 Terrence Howard as Los Angeles County Deputy District Attorney Jonah "Joe" Dekker (crossing over with Law & Order: Los Angeles)

Special guest star
 Diane Neal as ADA Casey Novak

Recurring cast

 Melissa Sagemiller as Assistant District Attorney Gillian Hardwicke
 James Chen as Crime Scene Unit Forensics Technician Adrian Sung
 Joel de la Fuente as Technical Assistance Response Unit Lieutenant Ruben Morales
 Francie Swift as Assistant District Attorney Sherri West
 Jamie Concepcion as Officer Delgado
 Charlie Tahan as Calvin Arliss
 Joe Grifasi as Defense Attorney Hashi Horowitz
 Caren Browning as Crime Scene Unit Captain Judith Siper
 Isabel Gillies as Kathy Stabler
 Anne James as Dr. Jane Larom
 Neal Bledsoe as Crime Scene Unit Forensics Technician Clifton Montgomery
 Maria Bello as Vivian Arliss
 Stephen Gregory as Dr. Kyle Beresford

 Gloria Reuben as AUSA Christine Danielson
 Austin Lysy as Defense Attorney Russell Hunter
 Jeremy Irons as Dr. Cap Jackson
 Amir Arison as Dr. Manning
 Christine Lahti as Executive ADA Sonya Paxton
 Joanna Merlin as Judge Lena Petrovsky
 Michael Boatman as Defense Attorney Dave Seaver
 Robert John Burke as Internal Affairs Bureau Lieutenant Ed Tucker
 Lindsay Crouse as Judge D. Andrews
 Zack Grenier as Judge Miranski
 Joseph Sikora as Jason Gambel
 Kat Foster as Sarah Hoyt
 Henry Ian Cusick as Erik Weber

Guest stars

Henry Ian Cusick played a graphic artist named Erik Weber in the first two episodes. Joan Cusack played the mother of two missing girls in the first episode. Jennifer Love Hewitt played a rape victim afraid to leave her house in the episode "Behave". Baer told TVGuide.com, "One of the reasons we wanted to do this episode is because it addresses Mariska Hargitay's passion for rape kits, which can help gather evidence to convict the rapists. But for some reason these kits have been sitting around unopened in cities all over the country." Skeet Ulrich guest-starred in the same episode as his Law & Order: LA character, Detective Rex Winters. Gloria Reuben guest starred as US Attorney Christine Danielson in the fourth episode "Merchandise", in which the death of a girl who was struck by a car reveals a child trafficking and slavery ring. Baer said of her appearance, "We're bringing back characters we love this season."

David Krumholtz guest starred in the fifth episode "Wet" with actress Rosemary Harris. Krumholtz played an expert on toxic mushrooms who is involved in the same murder investigation that involved Harris' character. Paula Patton, who was originally cast in the role of ADA, also makes a guest appearance as ADA Mikka Von. In the episode, her character is fired because she sent a defense attorney on vacation in order to give the detectives more time in finding who actually committed the murder. In the sixth episode "Branded", Michael Gladis and Kevin Alejandro played two of a trio of rape victims. "They have been branded and sodomized by someone", revealed Baer, who said the show posed the questions, "is there a connection between these men, and what nut case is on the loose?" David Alan Grier played defense attorney Jeremy Swift. Jason Wiles also joined Gladis, Alejandro, and Grier in the episode. Wiles played Alexander Gammon, who becomes a rapist's target.

Maria Bello appeared in the season's seventh episode "Trophy" as Vivian Arliss. After identifying an ex-convict as the prime suspect for the rape and murder of a girl, Benson discovers that Arliss' mother was raped by the same man. Arliss leaves her son Calvin (Charlie Tahan) in Benson's custody to find the boy's father. She later appeared in tenth episode "Rescue". Marcia Gay Harden returned in the season's eighth episode "Penetration" as FBI Agent Dana Lewis. Agent Lewis is raped while undercover, and her rapist has a connection to one of her previous undercover operations in "Raw".

Drea de Matteo guest starred as Sondra in the eleventh episode "Pop", as a pregnant battered wife whose abuser also beats her son from another marriage. Matteo said in an interview that she had not read the script prior to accepting the role and explained that, "I just knew that they wanted me to do something on the show and I'm a fan of the show, I was really excited to be on this show. This is like a New York staple. It's part of our culture here". Olympia Dukakis also guest-starred in that episode as an attorney named Debby Marsh, who is hired to represent the son (Al Calderon) of Sondra. Taryn Manning guest starred in the twelfth episode, "Possessed", portraying a woman who years earlier had been coerced into porn. Peyton List also guest starred as the young version of Taryn Manning's onscreen character, Larissa Welsh. They filmed scenes in December 2010. Jeremy Irons guest starred in "Mask" as Dr. Cap Jackson, a sex therapist who runs a sex addiction rehab clinic. "We're elated to work with an actor of Jeremy's caliber", Baer said. "He brings depth, intelligence and charisma to all his varied roles and we couldn't be luckier to have him guest-star on SVU." A.J. Cook guest starred in the same episode as Irons, and Cook portrayed OBGYN Debbie Shields, the lesbian lover of the daughter of Irons' character. Baer mentioned that "[h]er character is brutally attacked."

Shohreh Aghdashloo guest starred as Detective Saliyah "Sunny" Qadri, an employee of the Brooklyn DA's office in the episode "Dirty". Colm Feore played a wealthy sexual predator named Jordan Hayes in the episode "Flight". Feore said of his character: "Harder is the psychology of a guy who gets his kicks from taking advantage of young women, girls really to be brutally honest. [It's tough] asking yourself what kind of a guy it is who needs to satisfy his desires, such as they are, with innocence". Debra Messing guest starred in the episode, "Pursuit", as a TV journalist who becomes the target of a stalker. Baer described her character as "[a] ballsy television journalist who sets out to nail pedophiles". LuAnn de Lesseps played a socialite who makes a gruesome discovery in the episode, "Bully". Executive producer Dan Truly described her character as a "slightly deranged, out of control artist". For her role, she had to pose semi-nude, for which she said she felt comfortable doing as it was "tasteful". The episode also featured guest appearances from Kate Burton and opera singer Renée Fleming.

Rose McGowan guest starred as another kind of temptress in the episode "Bombshell". Baer said, "Rose plays a grifter named Cassandra who strikes swinging men who frequent sex clubs. And we're very excited to have her." Ryan Hurst also guest starred. Elizabeth Mitchell, signed for a "horrifying" guest role in the episode "Totem". She guest starred alongside returning guest star Jeremy Irons, who appeared earlier in the season as Dr. Cap Jackson. Elizabeth played an unmarried piano teacher who was the last person to see one of her students alive. For the first time, the series dealt with a case in which a woman is suspected of sexually assaulting and murdering a child. Because of the rarity of this offense, Dr. Jackson is called in to consult with Benson and Stabler because he has studied women who have committed this type of crime.

Diane Neal, who portrayed ADA Casey Novak from the fifth season until the end of the ninth season, reprised her role for the episode "Reparations" along with Law & Order: LA actor Terrence Howard, whose character (DDA Joe Dekker) comes to New York to defend his cousin. This episode was the second crossover-episode with Law & Order: LA of the season. Lori Singer played Dede, a mother whose baby is kidnapped in the episode "Bang". John Stamos guest starred in the same episode playing an adoption attorney with a secret passion. Rita Wilson played Bree Mazelon, the protective mother of a teen (Sterling Beaumon) under investigation in the episode, "Delinquent".

Episodes

References

External links
 Season 12 episodes at IMDb.com

12
2010 American television seasons
2011 American television seasons